Arbër Malaj (born 11 April 1989) is an Albanian football player. He plays as a defender for Duhner SC in the German lower leagues.

References

External links
 Profile - FSHF
 Profile at Albaniasoccer.

1989 births
Living people
Albanian footballers
Association football defenders
Flamurtari Vlorë players
FC Kamza players
KS Kastrioti players
KF Bylis Ballsh players
KF Adriatiku Mamurrasi players
KF Butrinti players
KS Sopoti Librazhd players
Albanian expatriate footballers
Expatriate footballers in Germany
Albanian expatriate sportspeople in Germany